Towdystan is an unincorporated settlement and First Nations community of the Dakelh people located northwest of Charlotte Lake in the western Chilcotin District of the Central Interior of British Columbia, Canada. The reserve had a population of 10, down 50% from a 2001 figure of 20.

References

Dakelh communities
Coast Mountains
Populated places in the Chilcotin
Unincorporated settlements in British Columbia